Combe Pafford is a village in Torbay in the English county of Devon.

References

Villages in Devon
Areas of Torquay